The 2016 New Zealand bravery awards were announced via a Special Honours List on 1 August 2016.

New Zealand Bravery Decoration (NZBD)
For an act of exceptional bravery in a situation of danger:

 Christopher Mark Foot – of Dunedin.
 Senior Constable Blair John Spalding – New Zealand Police, of Hamilton.
 Constable Benjamin Patrick Turner – New Zealand Police, of Ōhaupō.

New Zealand Bravery Medal (NZBM)
For an act of bravery:

 Dr Christopher Michael Thomas Henry – of Kaikoura.
 Carl Jennings – of Sydney, Australia.
 Sergeant Ryan William Lilleby – New Zealand Police, of Auckland.
 Constable Christopher Steven McDowell – New Zealand Police, of Drury.
 Constable Thomas Deane O’Connor – New Zealand Police, of Papamoa.
 George Puturangi Paekau – of Hamilton.
 Dr David Gwyther Richards  – of Christchurch.
 James Nicholas Watkins  – of Christchurch.

References

New Zealand Royal Honours System
Bravery awards
Hon
New Zealand bravery awards